Life as a Rider is the seventh studio album by American rapper C-Bo, released January 29, 2002, on West Coast Mafia and Warlock Records. It peaked at number 41 on the Billboard Top R&B/Hip-Hop Albums and at number 8 on the Billboard Top Independent Albums.  It was produced by Bosko, Floss P, Mike Mosley and Rhythm D. The album features guest performances by West Coast heavy-weights: Kokane, Outlawz, Killa Tay, CJ Mac, Dresta, Tray Dee and Yukmouth.

Track listing
"Cowboy" (featuring Kokane)
"What U No Bout" (featuring Outlawz)
"West Coast" (featuring 151, Killa Tay & Spade)
"I Am C-Bo" (Skit)	
"Creep" (featuring Yukmouth)
"Undadawgs" (featuring CJ Mac & Dresta)
"Who Bangin'" (featuring Boo Capone, Jamal, Lil Daddy, Speedy & Young Meek)
"If It Ain't Ruff"
"Let Me Ride" (featuring Don )
"Routine Check"
"Who Got Flows"
"Haters, Music, Hows" (Skit)	
"Don't Love These Hoes"
"G's & Hustlas" (featuring Tray Dee)
"Rag Lo-Lo's"
"Outro"

Chart history

References

External links
 Life as a Rider at Discogs

2002 albums
C-Bo albums
Warlock Records albums
Albums produced by Bosko
Albums produced by Rhythum D